The 1978–79 Copa del Rey was the 77th staging of the Spanish Cup. The competition began on 20 September 1978 and concluded on 30 June 1979 with the final.

First round

|}
Bye: Valladolid Promesas

Second round

|}
Bye: Valladolid

Third round

|}

Fourth round

|}

Bye: Murcia, Celta, Sevilla, Rayo Vallecano, Athletic Bilbao, Elche, Salamanca, Alavés and Burgos.

Round of 16

|}

Quarter-finals

|}

Semi-finals

|}

Final

|}

External links
 rsssf.com
 linguasport.com

Copa del Rey seasons
Copa del Rey
Copa